The Selective Service System (SSS) is an independent agency of the United States government that maintains information on U.S. citizens and other U.S. residents potentially subject to military conscription (i.e., the draft) and carries out contingency planning and preparations for two types of draft: a general draft based on registration lists of men aged 18–25, and a special-skills draft based on professional licensing lists of workers in specified health care occupations. In the event of either type of draft, the Selective Service System would send out induction notices, adjudicate claims for deferments or exemptions, and assign draftees classified as conscientious objectors to alternative service work. All male U.S. citizens and immigrant non-citizens who are between the ages of 18 and 25 are required by law to have registered within 30 days of their 18th birthdays, and must notify the Selective Service within ten days of any changes to any of the information they provided on their registration cards, such as a change of address. The Selective Service System is a contingency mechanism for the possibility that conscription becomes necessary.

Registration with Selective Service may be required for various federal programs and benefits, including job training, federal employment, and naturalization.

The Selective Service System provides the names of all registrants to the Joint Advertising Marketing Research & Studies (JAMRS) program for inclusion in the JAMRS Consolidated Recruitment Database. The names are distributed to the Services for recruiting purposes on a quarterly basis.

Regulations are codified at Title 32 of the Code of Federal Regulations, Chapter XVI.

History

1917 to 1920

Following the U.S. declaration of war against Germany on 6 April, the Selective Service Act of 1917 (40 Stat. 76) was passed by the 65th United States Congress on 18 May 1917, creating the Selective Service System. President Woodrow Wilson signed the act into law after the U.S. Army failed to meet its target of expanding to 1 million men after six weeks. The act gave the president the power to conscript men for military service. All men aged 21 to 30 were required to enlist for military service for a service period of 12 months. As of mid-November 1917, all registrants were placed in one of five new classifications. Men in Class I were the first to be drafted, and men in lower classifications were deferred. Dependency deferments for registrants who were fathers or husbands were especially widespread. The age limit was later raised in August 1918 to a maximum age of 45. The military draft was discontinued in 1920.

1940 to 1947

The Selective Training and Service Act of 1940 was passed by Congress on 16 September 1940, establishing the first peacetime conscription in United States history. It required all men between the ages of 18 to 64 to register with the Selective Service. To register, men typically completed a D.S.S. Form 1 Military Draft Registration Card from the Director of Selective Service. Over 49 million draft cards were completed, including The Old Man's Draft.

It originally conscripted all men aged 21 to 35 for a service period of 12 months. In 1941 the military service period was extended to 18 months; later that year the age bracket was increased to include men aged 18 to 37. Following the  Japanese air raid attack on Pearl Harbor on 7 December 1941, and the subsequent declarations of war by the United States against the Empire of Japan and a few days later against Nazi Germany, the service period was subsequently extended in early 1942 to last for the duration of the war, plus a six-month service in the Organized Reserves.

In his 1945 State of the Union address, President Franklin Delano Roosevelt requested that the draft be expanded to include female nurses (male nurses were not allowed), to overcome a shortage that was endangering military medical care. This began a debate over the drafting of all women, which was defeated in the House of Representatives. A bill to draft nurses was passed by the House, but died without a vote in the Senate. The publicity caused more nurses to volunteer and agencies  streamlined recruiting.

The Selective Service System created by the 1940 act was terminated by the act of 31 March 1947.

1948 to 1969

The Selective Service Act of 1948, enacted in June of that year, created a new and separate system, the basis for the modern system. All men 18 years and older had to register with the Selective Service. All men between the ages of 18 to 25 were eligible to be drafted for a service requirement of 21 months. This was followed by a commitment for either 12 consecutive months of active service or 36 consecutive months of service in the reserves, with a statutory term of military service set at a minimum of five years total. Conscripts could volunteer for military service in the regular United States Army for a term of four years or the Organized Reserves for a term of six years. Due to deep postwar budget cuts, only 100,000 conscripts were chosen in 1948. In 1950, the number of conscripts was greatly increased to meet the demands of the Korean War (1950–1953).

The outbreak of the Korean War fostered the creation of the Universal Military Training and Service Act of 1951. Students attending a college or training program full-time could request an exemption, which was extended as long as they were students. A Universal Military Training clause was inserted that would have made all men obligated to perform 12 months of military service and training if the act was amended by later legislation. Despite successive attempts over the next several years, however, such legislation was never passed.

President John F. Kennedy set up  (signed on 10 September 1963), granting an exemption from conscription for married men between the ages of 19 and 26. However, married men with children or other dependents and men married before the executive order went into effect were still exempt.

The Military Selective Service Act of 1967 expanded the ages of conscription to the ages of 18 to 55. It still granted student deferments, but ended them upon either the student's completion of a four-year degree or his 24th birthday, whichever came first.

1969 to 1975
On 26 November 1969, President Richard Nixon signed an amendment to the Military Selective Service Act of 1967 that established conscription based on random selection (lottery). The first draft lottery was held on 1 December 1969; it determined the order of call for induction during calendar year 1970, for registrants born between 1 January 1944, and 31 December 1950. The highest lottery number called for possible induction was 195. The second lottery, on 1 July 1970, pertained to men born in 1951. The highest lottery number called for possible induction was 125. The third was on 5 August 1971, pertaining to men born in 1952; the highest lottery number called was 95.

In 1971, the Military Selective Service Act was further amended to make registration compulsory; all men had to register within a period 30 days before and 29 days after their 18th birthdays. Registrants were classified 1-A (eligible for military service), 1-AO (conscientious objector available for non-combatant military service), and 1-O (conscientious objector available for alternate community service). Student deferments were ended, except for divinity students, who received a 2-D Selective Service classification. Men who were not classifiable as eligible for service due to a disqualification were classified 1-N. Men who are incapable of serving for medical or psychological unfitness are classified 4-F. Upon completion of military service the classification of 4-A was assigned.  Draft classifications of 1-A were changed to 1-H (registrant not currently subject to processing for induction) for men not selected for service after the calendar year they were eligible for the draft. (These – and other – draft classifications were in place long before 1971.) Also, draft board membership requirements were reformed: minimum age of board members was dropped from 30 to 18, members over 65 or who had served on the board for 20 or more years had to retire, and membership had to proportionally reflect the ethnic and cultural makeup of the local community.

On 27 January 1973, Secretary of Defense Melvin R. Laird announced the creation of an all-volunteer armed forces, negating the need for the military draft. The seventh and final lottery drawing was held on 12 March 1975, pertaining to men born in 1956, who would have been called to report for induction in 1976. But no new draft orders were issued after 1972.

1975 to 1980
On 29 March 1975, President Gerald R. Ford, whose own son, Steven Ford, had earlier failed to register for the draft as required, signed Proclamation 4360 (Terminating Registration Procedures Under Military Selective Service Act), eliminating the registration requirement for all 18- to 25-year-old male citizens.

1980 to present
On 2 July 1980, President Jimmy Carter, signed Proclamation 4771 (Registration Under the Military Selective Service Act) in response to the Soviet invasion of Afghanistan in the previous year of 1979, retroactively re-establishing the Selective Service registration requirement for all 18- to 26-year-old male citizens born on or after 1 January 1960. As a result, only men born between 29 March 1957, and 31 December 1959, were completely exempt from Selective Service registration.

The first registrations after Proclamation 4771 took place at various post offices across the nation on 21 July 1980, for men born in calendar year 1960. Pursuant to the presidential proclamation, all those men born in 1960 were required to register that week. Men born in 1961 were required to register the following week. Men born in 1962 were required to register during the week beginning 5 January 1981. Men born in 1963 and after were required to register within 30 days before or after their 18th birthday.

A bill to abolish the Selective Service System was introduced in the United States House of Representatives on 10 February 2016. H.R. 4523 would end draft registration and eliminate the authority of the president to order anyone to register for the draft, abolish the Selective Service System, and effectively repeal the "Solomon Amendments" making registration for the draft a condition of federal student aid, jobs, and job training. The bill would leave in place, however, laws in some states making registration for the draft a condition of some state benefits.  On 9 June 2016, a similar bill was introduced in the United States Senate, called the "Muhammad Ali Voluntary Service Act".

On 27 April 2016, the House Armed Services Committee voted to add an amendment to the National Defense Authorization Act for Fiscal Year 2017 to extend the authority for draft registration to women. On 12 May 2016, the Senate Armed Services Committee voted to add a similar provision to its version of the bill. If the bill including this provision had been enacted into law, it would have authorized (but not require) the president to order young women as well as young men to register with the Selective Service System.

The House-Senate conference committee for the National Defense Authorization Act for Fiscal Year 2017 removed the provision of the House version of the bill that would have authorized the president to order women as well as men to register with the Selective Service System, but added a new section to create a "National Commission on Military, National, and Public Service" (NCMNPS). This provision was enacted into law on 23 December 2016 as Subtitle F of Public Law 114–328. The commission was to study and make recommendations by March 2020 on the draft, draft registration, registration of women, and "the feasibility and advisability of modifying the military selective service process in order to obtain for military, national, and  public  service individuals with skills (such as medical, dental, and nursing skills, language skills, cyber skills, and science, technology, engineering, and mathematics (STEM) skills) for which the Nation has a critical need, without regard to age or sex". During 2018 and 2019, the commission held both public and closed-door meetings with members of the public and invited experts and other witnesses.

In February 2019, a challenge to the Military Selective Service Act, which provides for the male-only draft, by the National Coalition for Men, was deemed unconstitutional by Judge Gray H. Miller in the United States District Court for the Southern District of Texas. Miller's opinion was based on the Supreme Court's past argument in Rostker v. Goldberg (1981) which had found the male-only draft constitutional because the military then did not allow women to serve. As the Department of Defense has since lifted most restrictions on women in the military, Miller ruled that the justifications no longer apply, and thus the act requiring only men to register would now be considered unconstitutional under the Equal Protection Clause. The government appealed this decision to the 5th Circuit Court of Appeals. Oral arguments on the appeal were heard on 3 March 2020. The District Court decision was reversed by the 5th Circuit Court of Appeals. A petition for review was declined by the U.S. Supreme Court.

In December 2019, the bipartisan "Selective Service Repeal Act", a bill to repeal the Military Selective Service Act and abolish the Selective Service System, H.R. 5492, was introduced in the U.S. House of Representatives by Representatives Peter DeFazio (D-OR) and Rodney Davis (R-IL). This bill was reintroduced in both the House (H.R. 2509) and the Senate (S. 1139) on 14 April 2021.

In January 2020, the Selective Service System website crashed following the US airstrike on Baghdad International Airport. An Internet meme about the event being the beginning of World War III began gaining in popularity very quickly, causing an influx of visitors to the Selective Service System website, which was not prepared to handle it.

Who must register

Under current law, all male U.S. citizens between 18 and 25 (inclusive) years of age are required to register within 30 days of their 18th birthdays. In addition, certain categories of non-US citizen men between 18 and 25 living in the United States must register, particularly permanent residents, refugees, asylum seekers, and illegal immigrants. Foreign men lawfully present in the United States who are non-immigrants, such as international students, visitors, and diplomats, are not required to register, so long as they remain in that status. If an alien's non-immigrant status lapses while he is in the United States and under the age of 26, he will be required to register. Failure to register as required is grounds for denying a petition for U.S. citizenship. Currently, citizens who are at least 17 years and 3 months old can pre-register so when they are eligible for registration, their information will automatically be added into the system.

In the current registration system, a man cannot indicate that he is a conscientious objector (CO) to war when registering, but he can make such a claim when being drafted. Some men choose to write on the registration card "I am a conscientious objector to war" to  document their conviction, even though the government will not have such a classification until there is a draft. A number of private organizations have programs for conscientious objectors to file a written record stating their beliefs.

In 1987, Congress ordered the Selective Service System to put in place a system capable of drafting "persons qualified for practice or employment in a health care occupation" in case such a special-skills draft should be ordered by Congress. In response, the Selective Service published plans for the "Health Care Personnel Delivery System" (HCPDS) in 1989, and has had them ready ever since. The concept underwent a preliminary field exercise in fiscal year 1998, followed by a more extensive nationwide readiness exercise in fiscal year 1999. The HCPDS plans include women and men age 20–54 in 57 job categories.

Until their 26th birthdays, registered men must notify Selective Service within 10 days of any changes to information regarding their status, such as name, current mailing address, permanent residence address, and "all information concerning his status ... which the classifying authority mails him a request therefor".

Gender
In February 2019, the male-only military draft registry was ruled to be unconstitutional by a federal district judge in National Coalition for Men v. Selective Service System. Following the ruling, Selective Service System attorney Jacob Daniels told reporters: "Things continue here at Selective Service as they have in the past, which is men between the ages of 18 and 25 are required to register with Selective Service. And at this time, until we receive guidance from either the court or from Congress, women are not required to register for Selective Service." On 13 August 2020, the federal district judge's opinion was unanimously overturned by the U.S. Court of Appeals for the 5th Circuit. The Court held that male-only military draft registration is constitutional on the basis that "only the Supreme Court may revise its precedent."

Selective Service bases the registration requirement on biological gender rather than gender identity. According to the SSS, individuals who are born male and changed their gender to female (trans women) are required to register while individuals who are born female and changed their gender to male (trans men) are not required to register.

A congressionally mandated commission recommended in March 2020 that women should be eligible for the draft.
In September 2021, the House of Representatives passed the National Defense Authorization Act for Fiscal Year 2022, which included an amendment that stated that "all Americans between the ages of 18 and 25 must register for selective service." This struck off the word "Male" which extended a potential draft to women; however, the amendment was removed before the National Defense Authorization Act was passed.

Failure to register

In 1980, men who knew they were required to register and did not do so could face up to five years in prison, fines of up to $50,000 or both if convicted. The potential fine was later increased to $250,000. Despite these possible penalties, government records indicate that from 1980 through 1986 there were only twenty indictments, of which nineteen were instigated in part by self-publicized and self-reported non-registration.

A principal element for conviction under the act is proving a violation of the act was intentional, i.e. knowing and willful. In the opinion of legal experts, this is almost impossible to prove unless there is evidence of a prospective defendant knowing about his obligation to register and intentionally choosing not to do so. Or, for example, when there is evidence the government at any time provided notice to the prospective defendant to register or report for induction, he was given an opportunity to comply, and the prospective defendant chose not to do so.

The last prosecution for non-registration was in January 1986. In interviews published in U.S. News & World Report in May 2016, current and former Selective Service System officials said that in 1988, the Department of Justice and Selective Service agreed to suspend any further prosecutions of non-registrants. No law since 1980 has required anyone to possess, carry, or show a draft card, and routine checks requiring identification virtually never include a request for a draft card.

As an alternative method of encouraging or coercing registration, Solomon Amendment laws were passed requiring that in order to receive financial aid, federal grants and loans, certain government benefits, eligibility for most federal employment, and (if the person is an immigrant) eligibility for citizenship, a young man had to be registered (or had to have been registered, if they are over 26 but were required to register between 18 and 26) with the Selective Service. Those who were required to register, but failed to do so before they turned 26, are no longer allowed to register, and thus may be permanently barred from federal jobs and other benefits, unless they can show to the Selective Service that their failure was not knowing and willful. There is a procedure to provide an "information letter" to the Selective Service for those in these situations, for example recent citizens who entered the US after their 26th birthday. The federal law requiring Selective Service registration as a condition of federal financial aid for higher education was overridden in December 2020, and the questions about Selective Service registration status on the FAFSA form will be eliminated by 1 July 2023.

Most states, as well as the District of Columbia, Guam, Northern Mariana Islands, and Virgin Islands, have passed laws requiring registration for men 18–25 to be eligible for programs that vary on a per-jurisdiction basis but typically include driver's licenses, state-funded higher education benefits, and state government jobs. Alaska also requires registration to receive an Alaska Permanent Fund dividend. Eight states (California, Connecticut, Indiana, Nebraska, Oregon, Vermont, Washington, and Wyoming) have no such requirements, though Indiana and Washington do give men 18–25 the option of registering with Selective Service when obtaining a driver's license or an identification card. The Department of Motor Vehicles of 27 states and 2 territories automatically register young men 18–25 with the Selective Service whenever they apply for driver licenses, learner permits, or non-driver identification cards.

There are some third-party organized efforts to compensate financial aid for those students losing benefits, including the Fund for Education and Training  (FEAT) and Student Aid Fund for Non-registrants.

Alien or dual-national registrant status
Some registrants are not U.S. citizens, or have dual nationality of the U.S. and another country; they fall instead into one of the following categories:
 Alien or Dual National (class 4-C): An alien is a person who is not a citizen of the United States. A dual national is a person who is a citizen of the United States and another country. They are defined in four classes.
 Registrants who have lived in the United States for less than a year are exempt from military training and service,  but become eligible after a year of cumulative residence (counting disjoint time periods).
 A registrant who left the United States before his Order to Report for Induction was issued and whose order has not been canceled. He may be classified in Class 4-C only for the period he resides outside of the United States. Upon his return to the United States, he must report the date of return and his current address to the Selective Service Area Office.
 A registrant who registered at a time required by Selective Service law and thereafter acquired status within one of its groups of persons exempt from registration. He will be eligible for this class only during the period of his exempt status. To support this claim, the registrant must submit documentation from the diplomatic agency of the country of which he is a subject verifying his exempt status.
 A registrant, lawfully admitted for permanent residence, as defined in Paragraph (2) of Section 101(a) of the Immigration and Nationality Act of 1952, as amended (66 Stat. 163, 8 U.S.C. 1101) who, by reason of their occupational status, is subject to adjustment to non-immigrant status under paragraph (15)(A), (15)(E), or (15)(G) or section 101(a). In this case, the person must also have executed a waiver of all rights, privileges, exemptions, and immunities which would otherwise accrue to him as a result of his occupational status.
 Dual national: The person is a citizen of both the United States and another country at the same time. The country must be one that allows its citizens dual citizenship and the registrant must be able to obtain and produce the proper papers to affirm this status.
 Treaty alien: Due to a treaty or international arrangement with the alien's country of origin, the registrant can choose to be ineligible for military training and service in the armed forces of the United States. However, once this exemption is taken, he can never apply for U.S. citizenship and may become inadmissible to reenter the U.S. after leaving unless he already served in the Armed Forces of a foreign country of which the alien was a national. Nevertheless, an alien who establishes clear and convincing evidence of certain factors may still override this kind of bar to naturalization.

Legal issues
The Selective Service System is authorized by the Article I, Section 8 of the United States Constitution which says Congress "shall have Power To ... provide for calling forth the Militia to execute the Laws of the Union;" The Selective Service Act is the law which established the Selective Service System under these provisions.

The act has been challenged in light of the Thirteenth Amendment to the United States Constitution which prohibits "involuntary servitude". These challenges, however, have not been supported by the courts; as the Supreme Court stated in Butler v. Perry (1916):
The amendment was adopted with reference to conditions existing since the foundation of our government, and the term 'involuntary servitude' was intended to cover those forms of compulsory labor akin to African slavery which, in practical operation, would tend to produce like undesirable results. It introduced no novel doctrine with respect of services always treated as exceptional, and certainly was not intended to interdict enforcement of those duties which individuals owe to the state, such as services in the army, militia, on the jury, etc.

During the First World War, the Supreme Court ruled in Arver v. United States (1918), also known as the Selective Draft Law Cases, that the draft did not violate the Constitution.

Later, during the Vietnam War, a federal appellate court also concluded that the draft was constitutional in Holmes v. United States (1968).

Since the reinstatement of draft registration in 1980, the Supreme Court has heard and decided four cases related to the Military Selective Service Act: Rostker v. Goldberg, 453 U.S. 57 (1981), upholding the constitutionality of requiring men but not women to register for the draft; Selective Service v. Minnesota Public Interest Research Group (MPIRG), 468 U.S. 841 (1984), upholding the constitutionality of the "Solomon Amendment", which requires applicants for Federal student aid to certify that they have complied with draft registration, either by having registered or by not being required to register; Wayte v. United States, 470 U.S. 598 (1985), upholding the policies and procedures which the Supreme Court thought the government had used to select the "most vocal" non-registrants for prosecution, after the government refused to comply with discovery orders by the trial court to produce documents and witnesses related to the selection of non-registrants for prosecution; and Elgin v. Department of Treasury, 567 U.S. 1 (2012), regarding procedures for judicial review of denial of federal employment for non-registrants.

The case National Coalition for Men v. Selective Service System resulted in the male-only draft registration being declared unconstitutional by a district court. That decision was reversed by the 5th Circuit Court of Appeals. A petition for review was then filed with the U.S. Supreme Court.

Structure and operation
The Selective Service System is an independent federal agency within the Executive Branch of the federal government of the United States. The Director of the Selective Service System reports directly to the President of the United States. Starting on the day of the inauguration of President Biden, the Selective Service System was under an acting director following the departure of the previous director, Don Benton, and pending the nomination and confirmation of a new permanent director.

During peacetime, the agency comprises a national headquarters, three regional headquarters, and a data management center. Even during peacetime, the agency is also aided by 11,000 volunteers serving on local boards and district appeal boards. During a mobilization that required activation of the draft, the agency would greatly expand by activating an additional 56 state headquarters, more than 400 area offices, and over 40 alternative service offices.

The agency's budget for the 2015–2016 fiscal year was about $23 million. In early 2016, the agency said that if women were required to register, its budget would need to be increased by about $9 million in the first year, and slightly less in subsequent years. This does not include any budget or expenses for enforcing or attempting to enforce the Military Selective Service Act. Costs of investigating, prosecuting, and imprisoning violators would be included in the budget of the Department of Justice.

Mobilization (draft) procedures
The description below is for a general draft under the current Selective Service regulations. Any or all of these procedures could be changed by Congress as part of the same legislation that would authorize inductions, or through separate legislation, so there is no guarantee that this is how any draft would actually work. Different procedures would be followed for a special-skills draft, such as activation of the Health Care Personnel Delivery System (HCPDS).

 Congress and the president authorize a draft: The president claims a crisis has occurred which requires more troops than the volunteer military can supply. Congress passes and the president signs legislation which revises the Military Selective Service Act to initiate a draft for military manpower.
 The lottery: A lottery based on birthdays determines the order in which registered men are called up by Selective Service. The first to be called, in a sequence determined by the lottery, will be men whose 20th birthday falls during the calendar year the induction takes place, followed, if needed, by those aged 21, 22, 23, 24, 25, 19 and 18 year olds (in that order).
 All parts of the Selective Service System are activated: The agency activates and orders its state directors and Reserve Force officers to report for duty.
 Physical, mental and moral evaluation of registrants: Registrants with low lottery numbers receive examination orders and are ordered to report for a physical, mental, and moral evaluation at a Military Entrance Processing Station (MEPS) to determine whether they are fit for military service. Once he is notified of the results of the evaluation, a registrant will be given 10 days to file a claim for exemption, postponement, or deferment.
 Local and appeal boards activated and induction notices sent: Local and appeal boards will begin processing registrant claims/appeals. Those who passed the military evaluation will receive induction orders. An inductee will have 10 days to report to a local MEPS for induction.
 First draftees are inducted: According to current plans, Selective Service must deliver the first inductees to the military within 193 days from the onset of a crisis.

Lottery procedures
If the agency were to mobilize and conduct a draft, a lottery would be held in full view of the public. First, all days of the year are placed into a capsule at random. Second, the numbers 1–365 (1–366 for lotteries held with respect to a leap year) are placed into a second capsule. These two capsules are certified for procedure, sealed in a drum, and stored.

In the event of a draft, the drums are taken out of storage and inspected to make sure they have not been tampered with. The lottery then takes place, and each date is paired with a number at random. For example, if January 19 is picked from the "date" capsule and the number 59 picked from the "number" capsule, all men of age 20 born on January 19 will be the 59th group to receive induction notices. This process continues until all dates are matched with a number.

Should all dates be used, the Selective Service will first conscript men at the age of 20, then 21, 22, 23, 24, 25, 19, and 18. Once all dates are paired, the dates will be sent to Selective Service System's Data Management Center.

Classifications

1948–1976

Present
If a draft were authorized by Congress, without any other changes being made in the law, local boards would classify registrants to determine whether they were exempt from military service. According to the Code of Federal Regulations Title 32, Chapter XVI, Sec. 1630.2, men would be sorted into the following categories:

Directors

See also

 Adjusted Service Rating Score, the demobilization points system employed by the US Army at the conclusion of World War II
 Civilian Public Service
 Conscription in China, a similar system in China
 Conscription in the United States
 Draft-card burning
 Draft evasion
 Lodge-Philbin Act
 Title 32 of the Code of Federal Regulations
 Cohen v. California

References

External links
 
 Selective Service System in the Federal Register
 Military Selective Service Act (PDF/details) as amended in the GPO Statute Compilations collection

Civil registries
Independent agencies of the United States government
Conscription in the United States
Government agencies established in 1917
Sexism in the United States